Caenoptychia is a monotypic, Neotropic, genus of satyrid butterflies. Its sole species, Caenoptychia boulleti, is found in south-eastern Brazil.

References

Euptychiina
Monotypic butterfly genera
Taxa named by Ferdinand Le Cerf
Butterflies described in 1919